Vicente Pérez may refer to:
 Vicente Pérez (footballer)
 Vicente Pérez (motorcyclist)
 Vicente Pérez Rosales, Chilean politician and diplomat
 Vicente Pérez Valdivieso, mayor of Ponce, Puerto Rico